Finland competed at the 1948 Summer Olympics in London, England. 129 competitors, 123 men and 6 women, took part in 84 events in 16 sports. As the country hosted the next Olympics in Helsinki, a Finnish segment was performed at the closing ceremony.

Medalists

Athletics

 

Men 
Track & road events 

Field events 

Combined events – Decathlon

Boxing

Canoeing

Cycling

Five cyclists, all men, represented Finland in 1948.

Individual road race
 Paul Backman
 Torvald Högström
 Erkki Koskinen

Team road race
 Paul Backman
 Torvald Högström
 Erkki Koskinen

Time trial
 Onni Kasslin

Team pursuit
 Onni Kasslin
 Paavo Kuusinen
 Erkki Koskinen
 Torvald Högström

Diving

Equestrian

Fencing

Six fencers, all men, represented Finland in 1948.

Men's foil
 Kauko Jalkanen
 Heikki Raitio

Men's team foil
 Kauko Jalkanen, Nils Sjöblom, Erkki Kerttula, Heikki Raitio

Men's épée
 Nils Sjöblom
 Erkki Kerttula
 Ilmari Vartia

Men's team épée
 Nils Sjöblom, Olavi Larkas, Erkki Kerttula, Ilmari Vartia, Kauko Jalkanen

Men's sabre
 Erkki Kerttula
 Nils Sjöblom
 Kauko Jalkanen

Gymnastics

Modern pentathlon

Three male pentathletes represented Finland in 1948.

 Lauri Vilkko
 Olavi Larkas
 Viktor Platan

Rowing

Finland had five male rowers participate in one out of seven rowing events in 1948.

 Men's coxed four
 Veikko Lommi
 Helge Forsberg
 Oiva Lommi
 Osrik Forsberg
 Veli Autio (cox)

Sailing

Shooting

Twelve shooters represented Finland in 1948. Pauli Janhonen won a silver medal in the 300 m rifle event.

25 metre pistol
 Leo Ravilo
 Väinö Heusala
 Jaakko Rintanen

50 metre pistol
 Eino Saarnikko
 Klaus Lahti
 Väinö Skarp

300 metre rifle
 Pauli Janhonen
 Kullervo Leskinen
 Olavi Elo

50 metre rifle
 Albert Ravila
 Veijo Kaakinen
 Onni Hynninen

Swimming

Weightlifting

Wrestling

Art competitions

References

External links
Official Olympic Reports
International Olympic Committee results database

Nations at the 1948 Summer Olympics
1948
Olympics